Colin Barker (30 June 1939 – 4 February 2019) was a British sociologist as well as a Marxist historian and writer. A former long-standing member of the Socialist Workers Party in Manchester, he was the author of numerous articles and works on Marxism, including a history of the Polish trade union Solidarity, Festival of the Oppressed.

Biography
A Trotskyist, Barker was a member of the International Socialism Group in Oxford and Manchester from 1962. He was a Senior Lecturer in Sociology at Manchester Metropolitan University from 1967 to 2002 and an organiser of the periodic International Conference on Alternative Futures and Popular Protest there.

Barker regularly spoke at the Socialist Workers Party's annual Marxism event. In 2013, he joined opposition to the SWP Central Committee's handling of the allegations of rape made against 'Comrade Delta'. He left the organisation in 2014 and joined the newly formed Revolutionary Socialism in the 21st Century (rs21) group.

Books
The Power Game. London: Pluto, 1972. .
Festival of the Oppressed: solidarity, reform and revolution in Poland, 1980-81. London: Bookmarks, 1986. .
Revolutionary Rehearsals (editor) (1987).
Marxism and Social Movements (co-editor). Leiden: Brill, 2013. .

Selected articles/works
Incomes policy, legislation and shop stewards (with Tony Cliff) (1966)
Involvement in strikes: some recent case-studies, etc (1966)
A Note On The Theory of Capitalist States (1978)
A ‘New’ Reformism?—A Critique of the Political Theory of Nicos Poulantzas (1979)
Origins and Significance of the Meiji Restoration (1982)
Solidarnosc: from Gdansk to military repression (with Kara Weber) (1982)
Festival of the Oppressed: Solidarity, Reform and Revolution in Poland, 1980-81 (1986)
Revolutionary Rehearsals (editor) (1987)
The development of British capitalist society: a Marxist debate (edited with David Nicholls) (1988)
To make another world: studies in protest and collective action (edited with Paul Kennedy) (1996) 
Leadership and social movements (edited with Michael Lavalette and Alan Johnson) (2001)
In the middle way (review of Geoff Eley Forging Democracy) (2004)
The rise of Solidarnosc (2005)
Strike 4 Freedom, Socialist Worker (2006)
Southend Trolleybuses (2012)
False Perspective: Murder in the Art Department (2013)

Notes

References

External links
Barker's website
Short bio  at The Women's Library, London Metropolitan University
Short bio in MMU sociology newsletter
Colin Barker Archive at Marxists Internet Archive

Catalogue of Barker's papers, held at the Modern Records Centre, University of Warwick

1939 births
2019 deaths
Academics of Manchester Metropolitan University
British Marxists
British sociologists
British Trotskyists
Historians of communism
British Marxist historians
Marxist writers